The Clanranald Trust for Scotland is a recognised non-profit organisation founded in 1995 and based in Carronvalley, Scotland. Its chairman is Charlie Allan.

Objectives 
The prime objectives of the Clanranald Trust for Scotland are the preservation and dissemination of Scottish culture and Scottish heritage through entertainment and education.

Activities 
 Duncarron medieval fort – major construction project: replica of a medieval castle courtyard as a visual interactive visitor attraction
Educational activities for schools, gala days and public events
Combat International Team – the official Clanranald fight team for stunt work in film and TV productions
Additional services to the film industry (actors, fight training, battle choreography, music scoring, video production, etc.)
Medieval martial arts classes – training on methods of medieval fighting; many members of the class participate in the International Combat Team
Retailing, costume making and supply, themed room dressing
Genealogy and Scottish History research services

History 
In 1995 the decision was taken recreate an original medieval village to illustrate the life and the culture of Scotland at that time. The Trust was established and the proceeds and donations taken by the various activities (see above) flow into this project; more than £400,000 has so far been made available for the construction of Duncarron. A big supporter was found by the film actor Russell Crowe, a close friend of the chairman Charlie Allan.

References

External links 

 The Clanranald Trust for Scotland website

Charities based in Scotland
1995 establishments in Scotland